Aphyocheirodon is a genus in the characin family. It contains the single species Aphyocheirodon hemigrammus, which is endemic to Brazil, where it is found in the upper Paraná River basin. This small fish is a threatened species.

References

Characidae
Monotypic ray-finned fish genera
Fish of Brazil
Endemic fauna of Brazil
Fish described in 1915